Lysandros Kaftanzoglou (Greek: Λύσανδρος Καυτανζόγλου, 1811 – 1885) was a Greek architect of the 19th century and Chancellor of the National Technical University of Athens.

He was born in Thessaloniki. During the massacres of the Greek community in 1821 by the Ottomans, his family left to Marseille. He later studied architecture in Rome.

He worked in independent Greece and designed buildings in Athens and other cities.

Some of his works include:
The building of the National Technical University of Athens.
The old St Andrew church in Patras.
The old building of Arsakeion, Athens (today houses the Council of State).
Cathedral Basilica of St. Dionysius the Areopagite
Saint Irene church, Athens
Ophthalmological Hospital, Athens
St Constantine church, Omonoia, Athens

The Kaftanzoglio Stadium in Thessaloniki is named after him.

Gallery

References

Sources
Λύσανδρος Καυταντζόγλου biography

Bibliography

1811 births
1885 deaths
People from Thessaloniki
Greek Macedonians
19th-century Greek architects
Academic staff of the National Technical University of Athens